Dominion Park was an amusement park in Montreal, Quebec, Canada, situated between Notre-Dame Street (near Haig Avenue) and the Saint Lawrence River in the early twentieth century. The park opened on June 2, 1906 and was shuttered in 1937, surviving two fires, in 1913 and 1919. It was owned by the Montreal Suburban Tramway and Power company.

See also
Belmont Park, Montreal

External links

Closed Canadians Parks Web site
"Bodies piled up after blaze", Montreal Gazette
"MONTREAL'S CONEY AFIRE.; Dominion Park Visited by a Spectacular Blaze," New York Times

Defunct amusement parks in Canada
History of Montreal
Culture of Montreal
1906 establishments in Quebec
1937 disestablishments in Quebec
Mercier–Hochelaga-Maisonneuve